Aquem is a census town and a suburb of city of Margao in South Goa district  in the state of Goa, India. It is home to the 6th Century Pandava caves which are likely Buddhist in origin.

Demographics
 India census, Aquem had a population of 4985. Males constitute 51% of the population and females 49%. Aquem has an average literacy rate of 70%, higher than the national average of 59.5%; with 55% of the males and 45% of females literate. 13% of the population is under 6 years of age.

References

Cities and towns in South Goa district
Comunidades of Goa